César Ortiz Puentenueva (born 30 January 1989) is a Spanish professional footballer who plays as a centre-back, most recently for Toledo.

Club career
Born in Toledo, Castile-La Mancha, Ortiz played youth football with Atlético Madrid. He only represented the B team as a senior, going on to spend five full seasons in Segunda División B. Additionally, he split 2009–10 on loan, to Albacete Balompié and Aris Thessaloniki FC, his first match as a professional occurring on 29 August 2009 as he featured the full 90 minutes for the former club in a 0–3 away loss against Rayo Vallecano.

Ortiz cut ties with Atlético in the summer of 2013, signing with Liga I side FC Vaslui. After one year in Romania, he joined SC Rheindorf Altach of the Austrian Football Bundesliga on a one-year contract.

Ortiz scored his first professional goal on 2 August 2015, but in a 3–1 defeat at FK Austria Wien.

References

External links

1989 births
Living people
Sportspeople from Toledo, Spain
Spanish footballers
Footballers from Castilla–La Mancha
Association football defenders
Segunda División players
Segunda División B players
Tercera División players
Atlético Madrid B players
Atlético Madrid footballers
Albacete Balompié players
CD Toledo players
Super League Greece players
Aris Thessaloniki F.C. players
Liga I players
FC Vaslui players
Austrian Football Bundesliga players
SC Rheindorf Altach players
SV Mattersburg players
Spain youth international footballers
Spanish expatriate footballers
Expatriate footballers in Greece
Expatriate footballers in Romania
Expatriate footballers in Austria
Spanish expatriate sportspeople in Greece
Spanish expatriate sportspeople in Romania
Spanish expatriate sportspeople in Austria